Mirosaljci may refer to:

 Mirosaljci (Arilje), a village in Serbia
 Mirosaljci (Lazarevac), a village in Serbia